The discography of Luca Hänni, a Swiss singer-songwriter and model. My Name Is Luca, Hänni's debut studio album, was released in May 2012. The album peaked at number one on the Swiss Albums Chart and includes the singles "Don't Think About Me" and "I Will Die for You". Living the Dream, Hänni's second studio album, was released in April 2013. The album peaked at number one on the Swiss Albums Chart and includes the single "Shameless". Dance Until We Die, Hänni's third studio album, was released in April 2014. The album peaked at number six on the Swiss Albums Chart and includes the singles "I Can't Get No Sleep" and "Good Time". When We Wake Up, Hänni's fourth studio album, was released in September 2015. The album peaked at number six on the Swiss Albums Chart and includes the singles "Set the World on Fire" and "Wonderful". 110 Karat, fifth studio album, was released in October 2020. The album peaked at number 2 on the Swiss Albums Chart and includes the singles "Powder", "Signs", "She Got Me", "Bella Bella", "Nebenbei", "Nie mehr allein" and "Diamant".

Albums

Extended plays

Singles

As lead artist

Promotional singles

Other charted songs

Music videos

References

Discographies of Swiss artists